Serhiy Ursulenko (born 9 November 1987) is a Ukrainian footballer who plays as a midfielder with FC Continentals.

Playing career

Ukraine 
Ursulenko began his football trade in 2005 with the FC Chornomorets Odesa academy. After his graduation from the Chernomorets academy system, he began playing in the Ukrainian Football Amateur League with FC Tarutino, Sovignon Tarutino, and Bessarabiya Odessa. In 2014, he played with FC Balkany Zorya, where he won the amateur title twice in 2016 which secured promotion to the Ukrainian Second League. He re-signed with Balkany and made his debut in the third division the following season.

In his debut season in the Second League, he assisted the team in securing promotion to the Ukrainian First League in 2017. He also finished as the club's top goal scorer with 14 goals. The following season he was transferred to FC Zhemchuzhyna Odesa where he appeared in two matches.

Canada 
In 2018, he went abroad to play in the Canadian Soccer League with FC Vorkuta. He helped Vorkuta secure a postseason berth by finishing second in the First Division. In the playoffs, he contributed a goal in the semifinal match against SC Waterloo Region which helped Vorkuta reach the CSL Championship final. Where he won the championship title after defeating Scarborough SC. 

The following season he assisted in securing the First Division title. In 2021, he returned to his former club Vorkuta. He assisted in securing Vorkuta's third regular-season title and secured the ProSound Cup against Scarborough. He also played in the 2021 playoffs where Vorkuta was defeated by Scarborough in the championship final.  

In 2022, Vorkuta was renamed FC Continentals and he re-signed with the club for the season. Throughout the season, he helped Continentals secure a playoff berth by finishing fourth in the standings. He made his third championship final appearance against Scarborough once more where he won his second championship title.

Honors 
FC Vorkuta 

 CSL Championship: 2018, 2022
 Canadian Soccer League First Division/Regular Season: 2019, 2021 
ProSound Cup: 2021

References  
 

1987 births
Living people
Ukrainian footballers
FC Balkany Zorya players
FC Zhemchuzhyna Odesa players
FC Continentals players
Ukrainian First League players
Ukrainian Amateur Football Championship players
Canadian Soccer League (1998–present) players
Association football midfielders
Ukrainian expatriate sportspeople in Canada
Expatriate soccer players in Canada
Ukrainian expatriate footballers
Ukrainian Second League players
Footballers from Odesa